This article provides details of international football games played by the Finland national football team from 2020 to present.

Results

2020

2021

2022

Notes

References

2020s in Finnish sport
Finland national football team